The Covini C6W is an Italian 2-seat 2-door sports coupé with a removable roof section. Inspiration for the car was taken from the 1976 Tyrrell P34, which had two pairs of smaller front wheels, a principle applied to the C6W. The project was started in 1974 but abandoned shortly after, and left dormant into the 1980s due to the lack of availability of low-profile tires at the time. In 2003 the project was revived and in 2004 the C6W was shown in prototype form. In 2005 a slightly revised version debuted at the Salon International de l'Auto, featuring new wheels, new roof structure and a refreshed interior, and went into limited production of 6-8 cars per year, as a result of a tie-up between PMI and Covini Engineering.

Construction
Drive wheels: RWD
Construction: Fiberglass and carbon fiber body over tubular steel frame
Front brakes: Brembo disc brakes, with ABS
Fuel feed: Direct petrol injection
Induction: Naturally Aspirated
Total displacement: 4.2 L (256.3 in³)
Maximum power:  @ 6400 rpm
Maximum torque:  @ 2700 rpm
V8: built by Audi

See also
 Covini Engineering
 Covini B24 Turbocooler
 Covini T40

Other 6-wheelers
 6-Wheel Pullman

Twin front axle 
 FAB 1 (fictional car)
 Ford Seattle-ite XXI (concept car)
 Panther 6
 Thunderbolt (speed record car)
 Tyrrell P34
 Bedford VAL

Twin rear axle 
 Ferrari 312T6
 March 2-4-0
 Williams FW07D and Williams FW08B
 SextoAuto
 Charles T. Pratt's 6-wheeler 1907 
 Pat Clancy Special  Powered by a Meyer-Drake engine, it sported no less than six wheels; it was raced at the Indianapolis 500 in 1948. 
 1923 Hispano Suiza Victoria Town Car Model H6A Barcelona
 some Auto Unions
 Citroën's 6-wheel Cruise Crosser concept 
 Dodge Ram T-Rex 6X6 only a handful made 
 USA 6X6 T-Rex evolved from Dodge Ram T-Rex 6X6 
 Trekol-39294
 Mercedes-Benz G63 AMG 6x6
 6-wheeled Range Rovers
 Hummer|Stretched 6-wheel Hummers
 6-wheeled Citroëns

Limousine
 MINI XXL Stretch Limo 2004

DIY
 6- wheel Camaro Sport Wagon  by Roly Fernandez, built in 1988
 6-wheel military tire hot rod by Sean Hartman; chassis is an upside down 1944 Dodge WC 62 troop carrier, the body is a 1935 Dodge pickup, powertrain is from a 1966 Chevelle. 
 1980 6-wheel Chevrolet El Camino

References

External links
Covini Engineering – official Covini website.

Sports cars
Cars of Italy
Six-wheeled vehicles
Cars introduced in 2004
Rear mid-engine, rear-wheel-drive vehicles